Zero (零楼) is a Singaporean drama which aired on SPH MediaWorks Channel U in November 2004. This series was one of the last broadcast by SPH MediaWorks before it amalgamated with MediaCorp.

Synopsis 
Sam (Bryan Wong) is an ambitious man who stops at nothing to achieve his goals and takes things for granted. A schemer by nature, he has many enemies and was assaulted in a parking lot. He falls into a deep coma and goes to a place called "zero" (零楼) where he is met by "001" (Guo Liang). As Sam's bad deeds and good deeds all cancel out each other, the angels can't decide whether to send him to "basement 1" (hell) or "level 1" (heaven).

Cast
Bryan Wong as Wang Weide (Sam)
Guo Liang as 001
Celest Chong as Zhang Xinlin
Adrian Pang as Insp Lee Yong Bang
Quan Yi Fong as Du Xiaowei (Nurse Toh)
Ix Shen as Liu Qingxiang 
Michelle Chia as guardian of level 1
Apple Hong as Zhou Meili
Li Wenhai as 5566
Ong Ai Leng as 808
Ezann Lee as Du Xiaoling
Adam Chen
Wong Woon Hong as 1003
Kym Ng as bus driver
Shaun Chen
Bernard Tan as Dr Zheng Junping
Johnny Ng as Charlie Chen
Darren Lim
Eelyn Kok as Fu Mingzhu

References

Singapore Chinese dramas
2004 Singaporean television series debuts
Channel U (Singapore) original programming